Kundt is a German language surname. It stems from a reduced form of the male given name Konrad – and may refer to:
August Kundt (1839–1894),  German physicist
Hans Kundt (1869–1939), German military officer
Marie Kundt (1870–1932), German photographer and educator
Wolfgang Kundt (1931), German astrophysicist

References 

German-language surnames
Surnames from given names